The Marjing Polo Complex is a sports complex dedicated to ancient Meitei deity Marjing, Sagol Kangjei and Meitei horse (Manipuri pony), built in the hilltop of the Heingang Ching, the sacred abode of God Marjing, located in Heingang, Imphal East district, Kangleipak.
It houses Marjing Polo Statue, the world's tallest equestrian statue of a polo player.

The total area of the Marjing Polo Complex is 23 acres, spreading over the Marjing hills with the grazing ground of the Meitei horses covering an area of about four acres.

It was done under the Central Financial Asistance in 2009.

Inauguration 
During March 2018, the Marjing Polo Complex was inaugurated by Nongthombam Biren, the then Chief Minister of Manipur, in the presence of Dr. Sapam Ranjan, the then Chairman of Tourism Corporation of Manipur Limited, L. Radhakishore, the then Chairman of Manipur Pollution Control Board, Kshetrimayum Biren, the then MLA of Lamlai, and other tourism officials.

Facilities 
Cable cars are planed to be made available for public service from the Langol Ching to the Marjing Hill and from the Marjing Hill to the Kangla Fort for the tourists.
A Polo Ground is planed to be made in the hillock of the Marjing Hills.

The Marjing Polo Complex provides the facility of taking care of the Meitei horses if the animal's owner doesn't have any facility to take care of their animals.

On 5 October 2022, Manipur Chief Minister N Biren Singh inaugurated an open gym in the Marjing Polo Complex, under his "Martial Arts Akademi, Manipur", with the support of the Government of Manipur. Security guards are also made to be present to safeguard the gym.

Development 

On 9 June 2019, a social group named "Manipur Updates" organised a tree plantation program at the Marjing Polo Complex, as a part of the "Mission Green Manipur" program.

Events 
The National Tourism Day 2022 was celebrated in the Marjing Polo Complex on 25 January 2022. It was organised by the Directorate of Tourism, Government of Manipur. The Marjing Polo Complex was selected as the venue for the event because of its tourism prospects.

The World Tourism Day was also organised in the Marjing Polo Complex, with the theme, "Tourism and Digital Transformation", on 27 September 2018.

The Manipur Sangai Festival 2022 was organised at 14 different venues, including one at the Marjing Polo Complex. 

The 6th Singju Festival 2022 was organised by the Singju Yokhatpa Lup Manipur in collaboration with the Ibudhou Marjing Khubam Kanba Lup Heingang at Marjing Polo Complex from 28 December 2022 to 8 January of the year 2023.

See also 
 Daughters of the Polo God
 Hapta Kangjeibung
 Kangla
 Kangla Nongpok Thong
 Kangla Nongpok Torban
 Khuman Lampak Main Stadium
 Manipuri Pony (film)
 Manung Kangjeibung
 Mount Manipur Memorial

Notes

References

External links 
 Marjing Polo Complex at 

Cultural heritage of India
Landmarks in India
Meitei culture
Monuments and memorials in India
Monuments and memorials in Imphal
Monuments and memorials in Manipur
Monuments and memorials to Meitei people
Monuments and memorials to Meitei royalties
Polo in India
Public art in India
Sport in India
Tourist attractions in India